Osgood Pond is a five hundred acre lake in the hamlet of Paul Smiths, Town of Brighton, Franklin County, New York.  It is the site of White Pine Camp, the Summer White House of President Calvin Coolidge, and of the historic Northbrook Lodge, listed on the National Register of Historic Places in 2014. Both were built by Benjamin A. Muncil.
Lakes of New York (state)
Lakes of Franklin County, New York
Tourist attractions in Franklin County, New York
Adirondack Park

Osgood pond is mesotrophic and circumneutral. It has adequate pH buffering capacity and therefore has low sensitivity to acid rain deposition. Due to its close proximity to State Route 30 it is moderately impacted by road salt pollution, with a total chloride concentration of 9.7 mg/L.

Natural History 
Fish species found in Osgood Pond include largemouth bass, northern pike, and brook trout. The lake is a popular location for ice fishing in the winter.

Invasive Species 
Two invasive snail species are found in Osgood Pond, the Chinese mystery snail and the banded mystery snail. No invasive plant species or zooplankton species have been detected in the lake.

References